José Rosales Herrador (19 March 1827 – 6 April 1891) was Provisional President of El Salvador from 18 June 1885 to 22 June 1885. Rosales Herrador was an important banker during the Presidency of Francisco Menéndez. He had a hospital named after him in 1902.

References

1827 births
1891 deaths
Presidents of El Salvador